Robert Pruitt may refer to:

 Robert Pruitt (artist) (born 1975), visual artist
 Robert Pruitt (politician) (born 1975), American politician from Georgia